Excessive Force is a 1993 American action film. It was directed by Jon Hess and written, co-produced and starred by Thomas Ian Griffith. It was released by New Line Cinema in the summer of 1993. Despite being panned by critics and becoming a box office bomb, the film had a direct-to-video sequel, called Excessive Force II: Force on Force (1995), that bears no relation to this film and does not follow its storyline.

Plot
Detective Terry McCain (Thomas Ian Griffith) is accused of robbery and murder and needs to prove his innocence with his own hands before the Chicago mafia and his fellow law enforcement officers take him out.

Cast
 Thomas Ian Griffith as Detective Terry McCain
 Charlotte Lewis as Anna Gilmour
 Lance Henriksen as Captain Raymond Devlin
 James Earl Jones as Jake
 Tony Todd as Detective Frankie Hawkins
 Tom Hodges as Detective Dylan
 Danny Goldring as Lieutenant Landry
 Richard Mawe as Sergeant Sam Atwell
 Christopher Garbrecht as "Red"
 Ian Gomez as Lucas
 Sam Sanders as Dexter
 Burt Young as Sal DiMarco
 W. Earl Brown as Vinnie DiMarco
 Antoni Corone as Tommy "Fat Tommy"
 Tom Milanovich as Mario
 Randy Popplewell as Tony
 Paula Anglin as Yvonne
 Susan Wood as Lisa
 Brian Leahy as Irish Gang Leader
 Carl Ciarfalio as Guard #1

Reception

Box office
Excessive Force grossed only $1,152,117 at box office and became a flop. The film opened on May 14, 1993, at 501 theaters, grossing only $308,499 on its opening Weekend.

Critical response
Excessive Force was panned by critics. TV Guide gave the film only one star out of four and stated: "At some point, Excessive Force, which lives up to its title, might have been envisioned as a taut, mysterious, high-action cop thriller. The end result, however, showcases relentless violence over plot—bludgeoning viewers with machine gun fire, bomb blasts, and endless kick-boxing battles. Joe Leydon of Variety wrote: "Even though New Line is going through the motions with a spotty, regional theatrical release, Excessive Force appears headed down the express lane to homevid, where it may find favor with undiscriminating action fans." Rich Rosell from digitallyObsessed! gave it a very negative review, stating: "All of the dull fistfights and fiery explosions can do little to make this anything more than it is, which is something we've all seen before, and not necessarily something we would want to see again."

Christopher Armstead from Film Critics United gave the film mixed review: "Excessive Force is not a good movie and Thomas Ian Griffith did not become a big action star. That makes us sad, even though he's had a nice career. Charlotte Lewis topless and Lance and Tony overacting makes us happier. And this why Excessive Force is in my personal collection." Nick Michalak writing at Forever Cinematic praised some aspects of Excessive Force, concluding: "Excessive Force is not a great action movie, but it's a really good effort that I did like.  The script is well written, and very well directed by Jon Hess, but it's really the exceptional acting talents of its admirable cast that allows this movie to be as good as it is.  If filled with lesser grade talents, this would really falter, but putting guys like Griffith, Henriksen, Todd, Jones, and more into it gives it some extra substance."

On Rotten Tomatoes, the film has an approval rating of 20% based on reviews from 5 critics.

References

External links 
 
 

1993 films
American action films
3 Arts Entertainment films
1993 action films
New Line Cinema films
Films scored by Charles Bernstein
1990s English-language films
1990s American films